Playhouse is a common term for a theatre. Specifically it may refer to:

Venues

Australia 
 Dunstan Playhouse, at the Adelaide Festival Centre, Adelaide, South Australia
 The Playhouse, at the Arts Centre Melbourne, Victoria
 The Playhouse, at the Canberra Theatre Centre in Canberra, ACT
 The Playhouse, at the National Institute of Dramatic Art, Sydney
 The Playhouse, at the Queensland Performing Arts Centre, Brisbane
 The Playhouse, at the Sydney Opera House, New South Wales
 The Playhouse Theatre (Perth), a theatre in Perth, Western Australia
 The Playhouse (1916–1933), became Garrick Theatre (Melbourne)

Austria
 , Austria
 , Austria
 Landestheater Niederösterreich in St. Pölten, Austria

Canada 
 The Playhouse (Fredericton), a theatre Fredericton, New Brunswick

Denmark 
 Royal Danish Playhouse, a theatre in Copenhagen

Germany
Many towns in Germany have municipal theatres which operate different venues: one frequently called  (literally, 'opera house') for musical theatre, and another called  (literally, 'play house') for plays. Both are commonly referred to as stages.
 , now Konzerthaus Berlin
 
 
 
 
 
 , Hamburg

New Zealand 

 Playhouse Theatre, Dunedin, a theatre in the Otago region of New Zealand

United Kingdom 
 The Playhouse, Cheltenham, a theatre Cheltenham, Gloucestershire
 The Playhouse, Colchester, a former theatre in Colchester, Essex
 Edinburgh Playhouse, a theatre cinema in Edinburgh, Scotland
 Epsom Playhouse, a theatre in Epsom and Ewell, Surrey
 Liverpool Playhouse, a theatre in Liverpool, Merseyside
 Newcastle Playhouse, a theatre in Newcastle upon Tyne, Tyne and Wear
 Nottingham Playhouse, a theatre in Nottingham, Nottinghamshire
 Oxford Playhouse, a theatre in Oxford, Oxfordshire
 Playhouse Theatre, London
 Playhouse (Sleaford), Sleaford, Lincolnshire
 Playhouse, Whitley Bay, Tyne and Wear
 The Playhouse, Weston-super-Mare, a theatre in Weston-super-Mare, Somerset
 Leeds Playhouse, a theatre in Leeds
 Bradford Playhouse a theatre in Bradford, West Yorkshire

United States 
Playhouse Theatre (New York City), New York 
 Blackfriars Playhouse, at the American Shakespeare Center, Staunton, Virginia
 Geffen Playhouse, a theatre in Los Angeles, California
 La Jolla Playhouse a theatre in San Diego, California
 Pasadena Playhouse, a theatre in Pasadena, California
 Playhouse on the Square, a theatre in Memphis, Tennessee
 Ridgefield Playhouse, a theatre in Ridgefield, Connecticut
 Lewis Family Playhouse, at the Victoria Gardens Cultural Center in Rancho Cucamonga, California ⋅
 Westport Country Playhouse, a theatre in Westport, Connecticut
 Cocoa Village Playhouse, a theatre in  Cocoa, Florida

Film and TV
 Playhouse (Philippine TV series), 2018 drama series on ABS-CBN
 Playhouse Disney, an international group of television channels and blocks for preschool-aged children
 The Playhouse (film), a 1921 film written and directed by Buster Keaton
 The Playhouse (radio show), a syndicated radio show based out of Portland, Oregon
 Pee-wee's Playhouse, an American children's television show that ran from 1986 to 1990
 ITV Playhouse, UK comedy-drama TV series that ran from 1967 to 1983

Music
 Playhouse Records, the label founded by Jim Copp and Ed Brown
 "Playhouses", a song by TV on the Radio from their 2006 album Return to Cookie Mountain
 Play House, song

Switzerland
 , Switzerland

Toys
 Wendy house (or playhouse), a small house for children to play in
 Dollhouse, a toy home made in miniature

See also
 Playing House (disambiguation)